Reinhard Adler (born 9 February 1947) is a retired German footballer.

Adler played for KSV Hessen Kassel 64 times between 1970 and 1972 after coming from SV Arminia Hannover. In 1973, Adler moved to Tennis Borussia Berlin, where he made 10 Bundesliga appearances for the Veilchen.

References

External links 
 

1947 births
Living people
German footballers
Association football midfielders
Bundesliga players
SV Arminia Hannover players
KSV Hessen Kassel players
Tennis Borussia Berlin players